Glyphodes negatalis, the karanj defoliator, is a moth of the family Crambidae. The species was first described by Francis Walker in 1859. It has a wide range in the tropics, including South Africa, The Gambia, Mali, India, Sri Lanka, Hong Kong, Japan, and eastern Australia (including New South Wales and Queensland).

The wingspan is about 20 mm. Adults are white with several ragged pale brown submarginal bands outlined in dark brown. The hindwings are white with brown veins and brown margins.

Biology
The larvae feed on Dillenia indica, Ficus microcarpa and Ficus religiosa (Moraceae). In India, they had been found also as a main defoliator of Pongamia pinnata (karanj), and in Japan, the larvae had been found on Ficus superba var. japonica.

References

Glyphodes
Moths of Japan
Fauna of the Gambia
Moths of Africa
Moths described in 1859